Mikhail Viktorovich Mysin (born 22 May 1979) is a Russian professional football coach and a former player.

Club career
He made his debut in the Russian Premier League in 1997 for FC Rotor Volgograd, and played one game for them in the UEFA Cup 1997–98.

Honours
Russian Premier League runner-up: 1997.

References

1979 births
Sportspeople from Volgograd
Living people
Russian footballers
Russia under-21 international footballers
Association football forwards
FC Rotor Volgograd players
FC Ural Yekaterinburg players
FC Spartak Vladikavkaz players
Russian Premier League players
FC Volga Nizhny Novgorod players
FC Ufa players
FC SKA-Khabarovsk players
FC Jūrmala players
Russian expatriate footballers
Expatriate footballers in Latvia
Russian expatriate sportspeople in Latvia
Russian football managers
FC Sever Murmansk players